Sir Ian may refer to:

Sir Ian Anstruther, writer
Sir Ian Blair, Head of the Metropolitan Police Service
Sir Ian Botham, cricketer
Sir Ian Campbell-Gray, soldier
Sir Ian Hamilton, general
Sir Ian Holm, actor
Sir Ian Kennedy, lawyer
Sir Ian Kershaw, historian
Sir Ian Lloyd, politician
Sir Ian McKellen, actor
Sir Ian McLennan, businessman
Sir Ian Malcolm, politician
Sir Ian Potter, businessman
Sir Ian Wrigglesworth, politician